Goiano may refer to:

 Demonym of Goiás state, Brazil
 Campeonato Goiano, a Brazilian football (soccer) competition
 Goiano (footballer, born 1935), full name Clenílton Ataíde Cavalcante, Brazilian football striker
 Sandro Goiano (born 1973), Brazilian football defensive midfielder
 Goiano (footballer, born 1980), full name Emerson Bueno dos Santos, Brazilian football right-back
 Keninha Goiano (born 1985), Brazilian football attacking midfielder